Poecilorchestes is a genus of jumping spiders that was first described by Eugène Louis Simon in 1901.  it contains only two species, found only in Papua New Guinea and on Borneo: P. decoratus and P. logunovi.

In Maddison's 2015 classification of the family Salticidae, Poecilorchestes is placed in the tribe Viciriini, part of the Salticoida clade of the subfamily Salticinae.

References

Salticidae
Salticidae genera
Spiders of Asia